The Limbo Line is a 1968 British spy thriller film directed by Samuel Gallu and starring Craig Stevens, Kate O'Mara and Eugene Deckers. It is based on the 1963 novel of the same title by Victor Canning. It was made as part of a 1960s boom in spy films in the wake of the success of the James Bond series.

It was shot at Pinewood Studios with sets designed by the art director Scott MacGregor.

Synopsis
Through a network known as the "Limbo Line", the KGB is kidnapping figures who have recently defected to the West and returning them to the Soviet Union for punishment. A British intelligence agent identifies the ballerina Irina Tovskia as the next victim, and sets out to rescue her in a mission that takes him from London, to Amsterdam and finally to Lübeck on the East German border. He is able to destroy the Limbo Line, but not prevent Irina being taken to Moscow.

Reception
The film received generally bad reviews, with The Times critic feeling it was old-fashioned. The Communist Morning Star attacked it as "disastrously incompetent".

Cast
 Craig Stevens as Richard Manston 
 Kate O'Mara as Irina Tovskia 
 Eugene Deckers as Cadillet 
 Moira Redmond as Ludmilla 
 Vladek Sheybal as Oleg 
 Yolande Turner as Pauline 
 Jean Marsh as Dilys 
 Rosemary Rogers as Joan Halst 
 Hugo De Vernier as Halst 
 Alan Barry as Williams 
 James Thornhill as Pieter 
 Norman Bird as John Chivers 
 Frederick Jaeger as Alex 
 Eric Mason as Castle 
 Denys Peek as Jan 
 Robert Urquhart as Edward Hardwick 
 Ferdy Mayne as Sutcliffe 
 Joan Benham as Lady Faraday 
 John Horsley as Richards

References

Bibliography
 Burton, Alan. Looking-Glass Wars: Spies on British Screens since 1960. Vernon Press, 2018.

External links
 

1968 films
1960s spy thriller films
British spy thriller films
Films shot at Pinewood Studios
Films directed by Samuel Gallu
Films set in London
Films set in Amsterdam
Films set in West Germany
Films set in East Germany
Films based on British novels
1960s English-language films
1960s British films